Piscinas is a comune (municipality) in the Province of South Sardinia in the Italian region Sardinia, located about  southwest of Cagliari and about  southeast of Carbonia, in the Sulcis-Iglesiente traditional subregion. 
Piscinas borders the following municipalities: Giba, Masainas, Santadi, Teulada, Tratalias, Villaperuccio.

References

Cities and towns in Sardinia
1988 establishments in Italy
States and territories established in 1988